The 1992 Armenian Cup was the first edition of the Armenian Cup, a football competition, since the Armenian independence. In 1992, the tournament had 31 participant, none of which were reserve teams.

Results

First round

Malatia received a bye to the second round.

The matches were played on 4 and 6 April 1992.

|}

Second round

The matches were played on 14 and 16 April 1992.

|}

Quarter-finals

The first legs were played on 27 April 1992. The second legs were played on 6 and 7 May 1992.

|}

Semi-finals

The first legs were played on 18 May 1992. The second legs were played on 22 May 1992.

|}

Final

See also
 1992 Armenian Premier League

External links
 1992 Armenian Cup at rsssf.com

Armenian Cup seasons
Armenia
Armenian Cup, 1992